An equivalent (symbol: officially equiv; unofficially but often Eq) is the amount of a substance that reacts with (or is equivalent to) an arbitrary amount (typically one mole) of another substance in a given chemical reaction. It is an archaic unit of measurement that was used in chemistry and the biological sciences (see ). The mass of an equivalent is called its equivalent weight.

Formula
 milligrams to  = mg x V / MW
 Example for elemental compounds: (mg element / elemental compound mass fraction) x V / MV
  to milligrams = mEq x MW / V

Common examples

mEq to milligram

Milligram to mEq

Formal definition
In a more formal definition, the equivalent is the amount of a substance needed to do one of the following:

 react with or supply one mole of hydrogen ions in an acid–base reaction
 react with or supply one mole of electrons in a redox reaction.

The "hydrogen ion" and the "electron" in these examples are respectively called the "reaction units."

By this definition, the number of equivalents of a given ion in a solution is equal to the number of moles of that ion multiplied by its valence. The solution has 1 mole or 1 equiv , 1 mole or 2 equiv , and 3 mole or 3 equiv .

In medicine and biochemistry
In biological systems, reactions often happen on small scales, involving small amounts of substances, so those substances are routinely described in terms of milliequivalents (symbol: officially mequiv; unofficially but often mEq or meq), the prefix milli- denoting a factor of one thousandth (10−3). Very often, the measure is used in terms of milliequivalents of solute per litre of solution (or milliNormal, where ). This is especially common for measurement of compounds in biological fluids; for instance, the healthy level of potassium in the blood of a human is defined between 3.5 and 5.0 mEq/L.

A certain amount of univalent ions provides the same amount of equivalents while the same amount of divalent ions provides twice the amount of equivalents. For example, 1 mmol (0.001 mol) of Na+ is equal to 1 meq, while 1 mmol of Ca2+ is equal to 2 meq.

References

External links
A dictionary of units of measurement 

Units of amount of substance
Stoichiometry
pl:Równoważnik chemiczny